Davy Jeanney (born 6 December 1986) is a French rallycross driver. He was the 2010 French rallycross champion and was runner-up in the 2013 European Rallycross Championship season in Supercars.

After running in selected rounds for the 2014 FIA World Rallycross Championship it was announced for 2015 that he would be driving full-time for Team Peugeot-Hansen in their Peugeot 208 WRX alongside Timmy Hansen. He took the first win for a Frenchman in the category at the 2015 World RX of Germany.

Racing record

Complete FIA European Rallycross Championship results

Division 2

Division 1A

Division 1

Supercar

Complete FIA World Rallycross Championship results

Supercar/RX1

References

External links

1986 births
Living people
French racing drivers
European Rallycross Championship drivers
World Rallycross Championship drivers
Peugeot Sport drivers